Clayton Beams (born 1 September 1991), is a former Australian rules footballer who played for the Brisbane Lions in the Australian Football League (AFL).

Early life

He was selected by the Brisbane Lions as a priority Queensland rookie selection (pick 76 overall) in the 2009 Rookie Draft from AFLQ club Labrador.

On the back of strong performances in the Brisbane Lions reserves side throughout 2010 and his selection in the Queensland state side, Beams was officially elevated at the 2010 AFL Draft and will commence the 2011 AFL season on the Brisbane Lions senior list. He was injured for a couple of games during the early part of the season

AFL career
Beams made his debut against Fremantle in Round 1 at the Gabba, with 13 disposals.  He played five of the first seven games of the season before breaking his foot and did not play for the remainder of the year.

Beams played in the round 1 victory against Melbourne and was rewarded the round 1 nomination for the 2012 AFL Rising Star for tagging Brent Moloney out of the game, whilst still collecting 25 possessions himself. He was the first Lion to be nominated since Jack Redden in 2010.

In October 2017, Beams was delisted by Brisbane, but was later recruited as a rookie in Brisbane. 

In September 2018, Beams was delisted again by Brisbane. 

Claye is the husband of superstar Shelby "Shelbs" Beams.

References

External links

1991 births
Living people
Brisbane Lions players
Labrador Australian Football Club players
Australian rules footballers from Queensland
Sportspeople from the Gold Coast, Queensland